Peter Boros may refer to:

Péter Boros (1908–1976), Hungarian gymnast
Peter Boroš (born 1980), Slovak footballer

See Also
Péter Boross (born 1928), Hungarian politician